Kedara is a 2019 Indian Bengali language slice of life film directed by Indraadip Dasgupta, and produced by Samiran Das under the banner of Kaleidoscope. The film starring Kaushik Ganguly, Rudranil Ghosh was released on 1 November 2019. This is the debut film of Indraadip Dasgupta as a film director. The music of the film was composed by Arijit Singh.

Plot
The narrative is an exploration of ennui, stagnancy and transformation. It is a slice of life, caught between two eternities of darkness. Through the course of the story, the protagonist ventures into an uncharted landscape of desires and choices. The film is a eulogic tribute to a dying art form, ventriloquism. The story has been woven from bildungsroman, and old Calcutta memories.

The film narrates the story of a feeble man who lives in a decrepit ancestral house. He is alone without a kin or care and is separated from his wife, albeit undivorced. Scorned by the maid and neighbourhood ruffians, our docile protagonist whiles away his days by striking up fictitious dialogues with carefully chosen people from his past. To add credibility to his daily conversations, he mimics the voices of his imagined guests with remarkable accuracy. Narasingha is a ventriloquist. When the relevance of his art started to fade away, so did his livelihood. Resigned to life under the shadow of his memories, he breaks bread with a junk-dealer, Keshto. Through the course of the film Narasingha ‘s loneliness becomes a painted picture, replete with images and voices borrowed from the past. The story takes a turn when Keshto presents him with an armchair, something he had always coveted to possess. The wooden armchair acts as a catalyst and brings about a transformation in his personality. It restores his confidence and adds bravado to his essence. But this transformation comes at the cost of his sanity, leading to a series of misfortunes and unexpected turns.

Cast
 Kaushik Ganguly - Narasingha
 Rudranil Ghosh - Keshto
 Joydeep Kundu
 Moushumi Sanyal Dasgupta
 Indranil Roy

Awards

66th National Film Awards 
 Special Jury Award - Indradip Dasgupta

WBFJA
Best Supporting Actor , Most Promising Director, Best Cinematographer .

References

External links
 
Bengali-language Indian films
2010s Bengali-language films
Indian drama films
2019 drama films
2019 films